The Soviet national junior football team was the under-16 (continental competitions) and under-17 (world competitions) football team of the Soviet Union. It ceased to exist as a result of the breakup of the Union.

Following the realignment of UEFA's youth competitions in 1982, the USSR Under-16 team was formed. The competition has been held since 1982. From 1982 to 2001 it was an Under-16 event. The team had a good record, winning the competition once, reaching the final twice, but failing to qualify for the last six on 10 occasions.

The team has participated in FIFA U-16 World Championship only once – in 1987 – after being qualified from European Under-16 championship as a runner-up. USSR won it in a final game against Nigeria by penalties. The team gained the Fair Play award. Yuriy Nikiforov scored 5 goals on the tournament but FIFA awarded the Golden Boot to Moussa Traoré because Côte d'Ivoire had scored fewer goals than USSR.

After the dissolution of the USSR (on December 26, 1991), the senior team played out its remaining fixtures, which were the finals of Euro 92. Because the USSR U-16s had, by December 26, already failed to qualify for their version of the 1992 European Championship, the former Soviet states didn't play as a combined team at U-17 level ever again.

Of the former Soviet states, only Russia entered the 1992–1993 competition.

UEFA U-16 Championship record 
 1982: Did not qualify. Lost quarter-finalists.
 1984: Runners-up.
 1985: Winners.
 1986: 3rd place.
 1987: Runners-up.
 1988: Did not qualify. Finished 2nd of 2 in qualification group.
 1989: Group stage. Finished 2nd in group D.
 1990: Did not qualify. Finished 2nd of 2 in qualification group.
 1991: Group stage. Finished 2nd in group D.
 1992: Did not qualify. Finished 2nd of 2 in qualification group as CIS.

See also 
 Soviet Union national football team
 Soviet Union national under-20 football team
 Soviet Union national under-18 football team
 UEFA European Under-17 Football Championship

External links
 UEFA Under-17 website Contains full results archive
 The Rec.Sport.Soccer Statistics Foundation Contains full record of U-17/U-16 Championships.

1982 establishments in the Soviet Union
1991 disestablishments in the Soviet Union
European national under-16 association football teams
Soviet Union national football team
Youth football in the Soviet Union